Joel Antonio Estay Silva (born 12 March 1978) is a Chilean former footballer.

Honours

Club
Unión La Calera
 Tercera División (1): 2000

San Marcos de Arica
Primera B de Chile (2): 2012, 2013–14

Individual
 Primera División Top Scorer (1): 2005 Apertura
 Primera B Top Scorer (1): 2008

External links
 Joel Estay at Football-Lineups
 
 

1978 births
Living people
Chilean footballers
Club Deportivo Universidad Católica footballers
Everton de Viña del Mar footballers
San Marcos de Arica footballers
Deportes La Serena footballers
Unión La Calera footballers
Club Deportivo Palestino footballers
Ñublense footballers
Chilean Primera División players
Primera B de Chile players
Association football forwards